The first season of The Equalizer an American crime drama television series premiered on February 7, 2021 on CBS and concluded on May 23, 2021. The season consisted of 10 episodes and marks the beginning of the second reboot in the franchise, following the 2014 film and its 2018 sequel, which was a reboot of the 1980s series with the same name.

The season sees the introduction of stars Queen Latifah, Tory Kittles, Adam Goldberg, Liza Lapira, Laya DeLeon Hayes, Lorraine Toussaint and Chris Noth who all appear in starring roles.

Cast and characters

Main
 Queen Latifah as Robyn McCall
 Tory Kittles as Marcus Dante
 Adam Goldberg as Harry Keshegian
 Liza Lapira as Melody Bayani
 Laya DeLeon Hayes as Delilah McCall
 Lorraine Toussaint as Viola Marsette
 Chris Noth as William Bishop

Recurring
 Erica Camarano as Detective Paley
 Jennifer Ferrin as Avery Grafton
 Frank Pando as Captain Torres

Episodes

Production

Development
In November 2019 it was announced that a reboot of The Equalizer was in the works at CBS starring Queen Latifah with Andrew Marlowe and Terri Miller as showrunners with Latifah serving as an executive producer. On January 27, 2020, CBS issued a pilot order for the new version. Latifah was announced as the lead star when the show first began development, Liza Lapira and Lorraine Toussaint were cast in regular roles as Melody Bayani and Viola Marsette, respectively. In March 2020, Tory Kittles also joined the main cast. On May 8, 2020, Chris Noth was cast as William Bishop in a starring capacity.

Reception

References

The Equalizer
2021 American television seasons